The list of uninhabited regions includes a number of places around the globe. The list changes year over year as human beings migrate into formerly uninhabited regions, or migrate out of formerly inhabited regions.

Definitions 
The exact definition of what makes a place "uninhabited" is not simple.

Nomadic hunter-gather and pastoral societies live in extremely low population densities and range across large territories where they camp, rather than staying in any one place year-round.  During the height of settler colonialism many European governments declared huge areas of the New World and Australia to be Terra nullius (land belonging to no one), but this was done to create a legal pretext to annex them to European empires; these lands were not, and are not uninhabited.  While some communities are still nomadic, there are many remote and isolated communities in the less populated parts of the world that are separated from each other by hundreds or thousands kilometres of "uninhabited" wilderness, but these regions are still used for trapping, berry picking, mushroom hunting and so on, and are of spiritual significance to the settled descendants of formerly nomadic people.

Other places may not have a permanent resident population and yet still contain many humans who stay temporarily, as for example in national parks.  Jasper National Park in Canada received 1,672,497 visitors in 2020 for example, but no one lives permanently in most of the park (Improvement District No. 12, the local government area that includes most of the park had a population of 0 in 2021).

Generally speaking, only a few regions of the dry-land part of the Earth are so remote or have such a harsh climate that no one uses those areas for even part of the year.  These places are tiny islands, the driest part of large deserts, very high mountains, and ice caps.  The only other areas which are completely free of people are areas set aside by law such as strict nature reserves, sacred mountains, bombing ranges, and exclusion zones.

List
As a group, the list of uninhabited places are called the "nonecumene".  This is a special geography term which means the uninhabited area of the world.

Africa 

The Sahara, the world's largest desert, is not uninhabited and even remote areas like In Guezzam Province, Algeria have a population of tens of thousands.  The only truly uninhabited places in the Sahara are the ergs: sand dune fields.  Even the hot and salty dried lake beds have Bedouin communities within them that graze their animals in the salt marshes and at nearby oases, for example the below-sea level Qattara Depression contains the tiny village of Qara Oasis and cannot be said to be truly uninhabited.

Antarctica 
All of Antarctica is uninhabited aside from a few scientific research stations.

Arctic 

Tens of thousands of people live north of the Arctic Circle and many hundreds of thousands more within in the Arctic Ocean drainage basin but outside of the Circle.  The only parts of the Arctic that are truly uninhabited are the interior and northernmost coasts of Greenland, many of the islands in the Canadian Arctic Archipelago and some other islands in Northern Norway and the Russian North.  Devon Island, in the Canadian North, is the world's largest uninhabited island.

Northeast Greenland National Park, which is the world's largest country subdivision and world's largest terrestrial protected area, has had a census population of 0 for many years since the only mine in the region closed.  Nevertheless parts, of this remote area can see seasonal use: 31 people and about 110 dogs were present over winter of 2008.  Likewise the largest national parks in the Canada

Australia 

Even the driest regions of Australia have indigenous communities within them.  In 1984 a previously-uncontacted tribe emerged from the Gibson Desert.  There are however, several ergs (sand dunes and salt plains) that are truly uninhabited.

North America 
Besides the in Arctic and Subarctic (see above), few areas of any size in North America can be said to be uninhabited.  Most of these are strict nature reserves or wilderness area protected by law.  Among the largest of these are Improvement District No. 25, Alberta (Tweedsmuir South Provincial Park, British Columbia (

Others (unsorted) 
 Antipodes Islands
 Ashmore and Cartier Islands
 Bajo Nuevo Bank
 Baker Island
 Ball's Pyramid
 Balleny Islands
 Big Major Cay
 Bouvet Island
 Much of the interior of Brazil
 Caroline Island
 Clipperton Island
 Dasht-e Kavir and Dasht-e Lut in Iran
 Much of Eastern Oregon
 Elephant Island
 Elobey Chico
 Ernst Thälmann Island
 Much of Fiordland, New Zealand
 Goa Island
 Gough Island 
 Hans Island
 Harmil
 Hashima Island
 Hatutu
 Heard Island and McDonald Islands
 Much of Iceland, especially its highlands
 The upper alpine zone and nival zone of the Himalaya (and most other high mountains).
 Howland Island 
 Ilha da Queimada Grande
 Inishark
 Jaco Island
 Jarvis Island
 Jong Batu
 Kahoolawe Island
 Kerguelen Islands
 Kingman Reef
 Mborokua
 Minquiers and Ecréhous
 Melville Island
 Monomoy Island
 Perejil Island
 Prince Edward Islands 
 Much of northeast Nevada
 Navassa Island
 Nomans Land
 Much in Far North Canada
 Much of Northern British Columbia
 Much of Northern Ontario
 Paracel Islands
 Palmyra Atoll
 Redonda
 Round Island
 South Orkney Islands
 Virtually all of the South China Sea islands
 Spratly Islands
 Stirling Island
 Siwalik (outermost Himalayan foothills) and surrounding alluvial skirt Bhabar in India, Pakistan, Nepal and Bhutan, apparently due to endemic malaria and droughty soils.
 St Kilda
 Tetepare Island
 Tibet's upper alpine zone and nival zone.
 Tinakula

See also
Desert island
List of ghost towns
Private island
List of largest protected areas

References

Lists by region
Human geography